Dumont is a French surname, which may refer to:

People
 Adèle Dumont d'Urville (1798–1842), wife of Jules Dumont d'Urville, who named Adélie Land after her
 Allen B. DuMont (1901–1965), American inventor, industrialist, and pioneer in the early years of television
 André Dumont (geologist) (1809–1857), Belgian geologist
 André Dumont (cyclist) (1903–1994), French racing cyclist
 André Dumont (politician) (1764–1838), French parliamentarian
 Annick Dumont (born 1962), French figure skating coach
 Augustin-Alexandre Dumont, known as Auguste Dumont (1801–1884), French sculptor
 Bernard Dumont (1927–1974), Canadian politician
 Bernard Dumont (fencer) (born 1946), French fencer
 Bruce DuMont (born 1944), American broadcaster and political analyst
 Bruno Dumont (born 1958), French motion picture director (of polemic La Vie de Jésus fame)
 Casey Dumont (born 1992), Australian international soccer player
 Charles Dumont (politician) (1867–1939), French politician
 Charles Dumont (singer) (born 1929), French singer and composer
 Charles Dumont de Sainte-Croix (1758–1830), French zoologist
 Christian Dumont (1963–2021), French biathlete
 Christian Dumont (cyclist) (born 1956), Belgian cyclist
 Dawn Dumont, Canadian Cree writer
 Delree Dumont (fl. early 21st century), Canadian Cree artist
 Denise Dumont (born 1955), Brazilian actress
 Domenique Dumont (fl. early 21st century), Latvian music producer
 Duke Dumont, stage name of Adam George Dyment (fl. early 21st century), British DJ
 Ebenezer Dumont (1814–1871), U.S. Representative from Indiana; general in the Union Army during the American Civil War
 Edme Dumont (1720–1775), French sculptor
 Edward C. DuMont (born 1961), American attorney, a former Solicitor General of California
 Eleanor Dumont (1829–1879), American gambler during the California Gold Rush
 Emma Dumont (born 1994), American actress, model, and dancer
 Éric Dumont (sailor) (born 1961), French yachtsman
 Éric Dumont-Baltet (fl. early 21st century), French horticulturalist and nursery gardener
 Étienne Dumont (1759–1829), Swiss French political writer
 Fernand Dumont (1927–1997), Canadian sociologist, poet and writer
 François Dumont (painter) (1751–1831), French painter of portrait miniatures
 François Dumont (pianist) (born 1985), French classical pianist
 François Dumont (sculptor) (1688–1729), French sculptor
 Frank Dumont (1848–1919), American minstrel show performer and manager
 Franz Dumont (1945–2012), German historian
 Gabriel Dumont (ice hockey) (born 1990), Canadian ice hockey player
 Gabriel Dumont (Métis leader) (1837–1906), Canadian indigenous leader of the Métis people
 Gaston Dumont (1932–1978), Luxembourgian cyclist
 George Dumont (1895–1956), American baseball pitcher
 Georges Dumont (1898–1966), Canadian physician and political figure
 Guillaume Dumont (1889–?), Belgian sculptor
 Guillaume Coutu Dumont (fl. early 21st century), Canadian electronic musician
 Guylaine Dumont (born 1967), Canadian beach volleyball player
 Henri Dumont (1610–1684), French musician and composer
 Henrique Dumont (1832–1892), Brazilian engineer and coffee farmer
 Ivy Dumont (born 1930), governor-general of the Bahamas
 Jacques-Edme Dumont (1761–1844), French sculptor
 Jean Dumont (cyclist) (born 1943), French road bicycle racer
 Jean Dumont (historian) (1923–2001), French historian and publisher
 Jean Dumont (politician) (1930–2021), French politician
 Jean Dumont (publicist) (1667–1727), French writer and historian
 Jean Dumont (wrestler) (1886–?), Belgian Greco-Roman wrestler
 Jean-Louis Dumont (born 1944), French politician
 Jean-Pierre Dumont, Canadian professional ice hockey forward
 José Dumont (born 1950), Brazilian TV and movie actor
 Joseph Dumont (1847–1912), Canadian merchant and political figure
 Jules Dumont d'Urville (1790–1842), French naval officer and explorer
 Julia Louisa Dumont (1794–1857), American educator and writer
 Julius du Mont (1881–1956), French chess writer
 Laurence Dumont (born 1958), French politician
 Léon Dumont (1837–1877), French psychologist and philosopher
 Lionel Dumont (born 1971), French former soldier and imprisoned terrorist
 Louis Dumont (1911–1998), French anthropologist
 Louis Dumont (ice hockey) (born 1973), Canadian ice hockey player
 Louise Dumont (1862–1932), German actress and theater director
 Lucille Dumont (1919–2016), Canadian singer and radio and television host
 Marcel Dumont (1885–1951), French film director
 Margaret Dumont (1882–1965), American actress
 Marie-Alice Dumont (1892–1985), Canadian photographer
 Marilyn Dumont (born 1955), Canadian poet and educator
 Mario Dumont (born 1970), Canadian politician from Québec
 Mary Dumont (fl. early 21st century), American chef
 Michel Dumont (1941–2020), Canadian actor
 Mike Dumont (fl. late 20th/early 21st centuries), U.S. Navy officer
 Nancy Dumont (1936–2002), Native American educational leader
 Nicolas Dumont (born 1940), Belgian water polo player
 Norbert Dumont (fl. early 20th century), Luxembourgish politician and jurist
 Paul Dumont (1920–2008), Canadian ice hockey administrator
 Pierre Dumont (painter) (1884–1936), French painter
 Pierre Dumont (sculptor) (c. 1650–?), French sculptor
 Pierre François Dumont (1789–1864), French industrialist
 Pierre-Henri Dumont (born 1987), French politician
 René Dumont (1904–2001), French agronomist, sociologist and scientist
 Richard M. Dumont (born 1959), Canadian voice actor, writer, and director
 Robert Dumont (fl. 1940s), French bobsledder
 Sabine Dumont, suspected French victim of serial killer Robert Black
 Sarah Dumont (born 1990), American actress and model
 Serge Dumont (born 1960), French businessperson
 Simon Dumont (born 1986), American freestyle skier
 Sky du Mont (born 1947), German actor
 Stéphane Dumont (born 1982), French footballer
 Stéphanie Dumont (born 1968), French speed skater
 Tom Dumont (born 1968), American musician, lead guitarist of No Doubt
 Trent Dumont (born 1995), Australian rules footballer
 Ulises Dumont (1937–2008), Argentine film actor
 Valentine Dumont (born 2000), Belgian swimmer
 W. Hunt Dumont (born 1941), American lawyer and judge
 Wayne Dumont (1914–1992), American politician from New Jersey
 Yvon Dumont (born 1951), former Lieutenant-Governor of the Province of Manitoba, Canada (1993–1999)

See also
 Alberto Santos-Dumont (1873–1932), Brazilian aviation pioneer and inventor
 Éric Dumont-Baltet, French horticulturalist

In fiction
Jethro Dumont, pulp magazine character as The Green Lama
Giles Dumont, boy who turns into a 'werefox' in The Werefox

French-language surnames
French toponymic surnames